General Francis Leighton (1696 – 9 June 1773) was a general of the British Army.

He was born the fourth son and ninth child of Sir Edward Leighton, 1st Baronet, of Wattlesborough in Shropshire. He entered the Army as a captain on 16 June 1716. In 1730 he transferred from major of Barrell's Regiment of Foot to major of Handasyd's Regiment of Foot, and on 6 July 1737 was promoted lieutenant-colonel of Blakeney's Regiment of Foot. During the Jacobite rising of 1745 Leighton was sent with a considerable force from Perth to hold the outpost of Castle Menzies. He was promoted colonel of the 32nd Regiment of Foot on 1 December 1747, major-general on 5 February 1757, lieutenant-general on 6 April 1759 and general on 25 May 1772.

Leighton died on 9 June 1773. By his wife, the former Miss Pinfold, he had a son, who died young, and two daughters: Charlotte, who died unmarried in 1820, and Frances, who was married on 16 May 1783 to Sir Hew Whitefoord Dalrymple, 1st Baronet.

References

1696 births
1773 deaths
British Army generals
Bedfordshire and Hertfordshire Regiment officers
Cheshire Regiment officers
27th Regiment of Foot officers
32nd Regiment of Foot officers
British Army personnel of the Jacobite rising of 1745
Military personnel from Shropshire